The Ohio High School Athletic Association (OHSAA) is the governing body of athletic programs for junior and senior high schools in the state of Ohio.  It conducts state championship competitions in all the OHSAA-sanctioned sports.

Fall sports

 List of OHSAA cross country champions
 List of OHSAA field hockey champions
 List of OHSAA football champions
 List of OHSAA golf champions
 List of OHSAA soccer champions
 List of OHSAA volleyball champions

Winter sports

 List of OHSAA basketball champions
 List of OHSAA bowling champions
 List of OHSAA gymnastics champions
 List of OHSAA ice hockey champions
 List of OHSAA swimming and diving champions
 List of OHSAA wrestling champions

Spring sports

 List of OHSAA baseball champions
 List of OHSAA softball champions
 List of OHSAA lacrosse champions
 List of OHSAA track and field champions

Schools with most team titles

 * X = single-sex school

Schools with most team titles in one sport

Schools with most team titles in one school year

Schools with boys' and girls' state titles in the same (or a similar) sport in the same year

Schools with most consecutive titles in one sport

See also
 List of high schools in Ohio
 Ohio High School Athletic Conferences
 Ohio High School Athletic Association

References

External links
Ohio High School Athletic Association official website
 Ohio Tennis Coaches' Association website
 Miami Valley Tennis Coaches' Association website

High school sports in Ohio